Mosso can refer to:

People
 Angelo Mosso (1846–1910), Italian physiologist

Places
Denmark
 Mossø lake in the  nature conservation reserve of Klostermølle
Italy
 Mosso, Piedmont, a former comune in the Province of Biella
 Valle Mosso, a former comune in the Province of Biella
 Strona di Mosso Valley, an alpine valley

Other uses
 Mosso (Rackspace Cloud), web application hosting service.
 See Tempo for the musical term.